The Museo Dolores Olmedo (or the Dolores Olmedo Museum) is an art museum in Xochimilco, Mexico City, based on the collection of the Mexican businesswoman Dolores Olmedo. The museum will be relocated to Chapultepec in 2024.

History
In 1962, Dolores Olmedo acquired a property at La Noria, Xochimilco in southern Mexico City, which she would later convert into the museum named after herself in 1994.  Donating her entire collection of art including pre-Hispanic, colonial, folk, modern and contemporary art, the Dolores Olmedo Patiño Museum hosts the greatest collection of Frida Kahlo, Diego Rivera, and Angelina Beloff artworks. Upon Olmedo's death in 2002, she left funds for taking care of her museum, now open to the public.

Collections
The five-building complex contains up to 170 paintings, including 145 by Diego Rivera, 25 by his wife Frida Kahlo, some of their scripts and drawings, nearly 6,000 pre-Hispanic figurines and sculptures, and diverse living animals such as geese, ducks, six Xoloitzcuintles, and Indian peafowls kept in the museum's gardens.

Recent developments
Recently new areas have been added to the museum, "her private rooms" where she kept original decorations of her house such as ivory, china, and artwork by artists whom she nurtured in her latter years including José Juárez and Francisco Guevara. The museum now holds a permanent exhibition of works by Russian-Mexican artist Angelina Beloff, who was Diego Rivera's first wife.

Gallery

References

External links
 Museo Dolores Olmedo website
Virtual tour of the Museo Dolores Olmedo provided by Google Arts & Culture

Art museums established in 1994
Art museums and galleries in Mexico
Museums in Mexico City
Biographical museums in Mexico
Museo Dolores Olmedo
Museo Dolores Olmedo
Historic house museums in Mexico